Angélica Sánchez Cautelán (born December 11, 1975) is a female long-distance runner from Mexico. She represented her native country at the 2004 Summer Olympics in Athens, Greece, where she finished in 46th place in the women's marathon event, clocking 2:49.04. Sánchez set her personal best (2:31.12) in the marathon on November 30, 2003, in Milan.

Achievements

References
 
 

1975 births
Living people
Mexican female long-distance runners
Mexican female steeplechase runners
Sportspeople from Tlaxcala
People from Tlaxcala City
Athletes (track and field) at the 2003 Pan American Games
Athletes (track and field) at the 2004 Summer Olympics
Olympic athletes of Mexico
Pan American Games competitors for Mexico
20th-century Mexican women
21st-century Mexican women